Shlomo Zabludowicz (1914–1994) was a Polish-born Israeli businessman. He gained wealth through the armament trade between the Finnish weapons manufacturer Tampella and Israel.

Biography
Shlomo Zabludowicz was born in a Jewish family in Łódź, Poland. His father was  a rabbi. Zabludowicz and his family was interned at the Auschwitz concentration camp, where only he and his wife Pola survived. After the war, he immigrated to Finland via Sweden. In Finland, he had two children, business magnate Poju Zabludowicz and ophthalmologist Rebecka Belldegrun.  In 1975, he immigrated to Israel.

Business career
Zabludowicz founded the investment firm Tamares that is currently owned by his son Poju. Zabludowicz was a prominent figure in creating the joint enterprise between Tampella and Solel Boneh, Soltam Systems. In the 1980s, he  began moving his investments to property.

References 

1914 births
1994 deaths
Arms traders
20th-century Finnish businesspeople
Finnish emigrants to Israel
Israeli chief executives
People from Łódź
Polish emigrants to Finland
20th-century Israeli businesspeople
Finnish Jews